PATH Foundation is a network of off-road trails in and around the metro Atlanta area for walkers, runners, skaters, and cyclists. The foundation was established in 1991. The goal was to develop a network of off-road trails in Atlanta in time for use during the 1996 Summer Olympics. The trails are also a way to connect neighborhoods and preserve the regional character. The first demonstration trails were built near Clarkston in DeKalb County. Presently, trails exist in Atlanta, Smyrna, Decatur, Stone Mountain, and Conyers.

PATH Foundation Trails

 Arabia Mountain
 Chastain Park
 Nancy Creek
 Northside Trail
Olde Town Conyers Trail
 PATH400
 Silver Comet Trail
 Stone Mountain
 South River Trail
 Whetstone Creek
 Trolley Line Trail

20th Anniversary and triPATHlon

In 2011, PATH celebrated its 20th anniversary. In May 2011, PATH created Atlanta's first in-town triathlon called triPATHlon and sanctioned by USA Triathlon. The triPATHlon benefited Chastain Park.

References

External links 
 PATH Foundation
 Silver Comet Trail
 Chastain Park
 Atlanta BeltLine

 
Cycling in Atlanta
Druid Hills, Georgia